United Nations Security Council Resolution 192, adopted unanimously on June 20, 1964, after a report by the Secretary-General regarding the United Nations Peacekeeping Force in Cyprus, the Council reaffirmed resolutions 186 and 187 and extended the stationing of the Force those resolutions established for an additional period of 3 months, to end on September 26, 1964.

See also
Cyprus dispute
List of United Nations Security Council Resolutions 101 to 200 (1953–1965)

References
Text of the Resolution at undocs.org

External links
 

 0192
 0192
1964 in Cyprus
June 1964 events